"Eduardo e Mônica" (Eduardo and Monica) is a song from Brazilian rock band Legião Urbana's 1986 album Dois, released as promo single. It tells a romantic story centered on a couple formed by the 16-year-old Eduardo and the older college student Mônica, who are very different from each other.

Writing and theme 
The song had already been recorded in 1982, when Russo performed alone with his acoustic guitar under the moniker "O Trovador Solitário" (The Solitary Troubadour), on a cassette tape that would be later recovered and released along with other songs on his posthumous solo album O Trovador Solitário.

This version has a different ending than the one from the album. In the latter, it is stated that in a certain vacation period, the family could not travel because the son was retaking a class in school. In the original version, the couple's son is still yet to be born and that they didn't get married in a church, but at Eduardo's ranch. Some verses were already scratched by then: "With an Indian flutist who marked the time signature/ All all friends..." They built a house somewhere close to the sea and went to Bahia, Ouro Preto and Rio de Janeiro. Eduardo got a job at Banco Central and Mônica is a professor.

A 2016 article by science magazine Superinteressante suggested that the couple was unlikely to have a long-lasting relationship, based on what the verses say about them and analyzing such info against diverse scientific researches on reasons why couples break up.

In other media 
The song inspired a play by Adolar Gangorra in which he depicts Eduardo as a victim of "a newspapers' culture pages pop culture, which Monica makes him follow".

A film based on the song was announced in 2019 with Gabriel Leone and Alice Braga on the titular roles. It will be directed by René Sampaio, who also directed Brazilian Western, another film based on a Legião Urbana song. The film was due on 11 June 2020 and it was screened at the 2020 edition of Miami International Film Festival, before it was cancelled following the COVID-19 pandemic. By June, its premiere date was still uncertain due to the pandemic.

Ads 
In 2001, fragments of the song were used in an ad by telecommunications company ATL (currently Claro). Later, on 7 June 2011, the song's 25th anniversary, a short clip was developed by another telecommunications company, Vivo. The clip, released on YouTube a few days before Valentine's Day in Brazil, is a tribute to the date and has the song as its soundtrack.

Notes

References

 

Legião Urbana songs
1986 songs
Songs written by Renato Russo
Songs written by Dado Villa-Lobos
Songs written by Marcelo Bonfá